Carlos Flores Rico (born 21 October 1952) is a Mexican politician affiliated with the Institutional Revolutionary Party. As of 2014 he served as Deputy of the LIX and LXI Legislatures of the Mexican Congress as a plurinominal representative.

References

1952 births
Living people
People from Ciudad Victoria
Members of the Chamber of Deputies (Mexico)
Institutional Revolutionary Party politicians
21st-century Mexican politicians
Politicians from Tamaulipas
National Autonomous University of Mexico alumni
Deputies of the LXI Legislature of Mexico